Miss International 1973, the 13th Miss International pageant, was held on October 13, 1973 at the Exposition Hall Fairgrounds in Osaka, Japan. 45 contestants competed for the pageant. Anneli Björkling from Finland was crowned as the winner by outgoing titleholder, Linda Hooks from United Kingdom.

Results

Placements

Contestants

  - Mónica Elena Neu
  - Paula Lesley Whitehead
  - Roswitha Kobald
  - Fiona Letta
  - Rosa Maria Columba González
  - Denise Penteado Costa
  - Zoe Spink
  - Nancy Henderson
  - Ethel Klenner Rodríguez
  - Tulia Inés Gómez Porras
  - Anette Grankvist
  - Pim Sanchez
  - Anneli Björkling
  - Christine Schmadth
  - Ingeborg Braun
  - Mariella Digiakomou
  - Elaine Marques
  - Marygold Toibinson
  - Yildiz de Kat
  - Rosa Edelinda López
  - Camilla Wong
  - Helga Eldon Jonsdóttir
  - Lynette Williams
  - Pauline Theresa Fitzsimons
  - Rosamaria Idrizi
  - Miki Yaita
  - Kim Mae-ja
  - Giselle Anita Nicole Azzeri
  - Nancy Thong
  - Marimar Zahra
  - Luz del Carmen Bermudez
  - Teresa Irene Hodgson
  - Nina Hernandez
  - Anne Katrine Ramstad
  - Maria Elena "Marilen" Suarez Ojeda
  - Aida Silva Tavares
  - Miriam Vargas
  - Doris Ong Swee Gek
  - Maria Isabel Lorenzo Saavedra
  - Yvonne Muttupulle
  - Suzanna Andersson
  - Dunya Claudia Wiederkehr
  - Edna Tepava
  - Chintana Techamaneevat
  - Nesrin Kekevi
  - Pia Nancy Canzani
  - Hilda Elvira Carrero García †

External links
 Pageantopolis - Miss International 1973

1973
1973 beauty pageants
Beauty pageants in Japan
1973 in Japan